Scymnus papago, is a species of beetle found in the family Coccinellidae discovered by Thomas Lincoln Casey Jr. in 1899. It is found in North America and Canada.

References 

Coccinellidae
Beetles of North America